Romeo and Juliet is a 1936 American film adapted from the play by William Shakespeare, directed by George Cukor from a screenplay by Talbot Jennings. The film stars Leslie Howard as Romeo and Norma Shearer as Juliet, and the supporting cast features John Barrymore, Basil Rathbone, and Andy Devine.

Plot

Cast

 Norma Shearer as Juliet
 Leslie Howard as Romeo
 John Barrymore as Mercutio
 Edna May Oliver as the Nurse
 Basil Rathbone as Tybalt
 C. Aubrey Smith as Lord Capulet
 Andy Devine as Peter, a servant
 Conway Tearle as Escalus – Prince of Verona
 Ralph Forbes as Paris
 Henry Kolker as Friar Laurence
 Robert Warwick as Lord Montague
 Virginia Hammond as Lady Montague 
 Reginald Denny as Benvolio
 Violet Kemble-Cooper as Lady Capulet

Uncredited cast includes Wallis Clark, Katherine DeMille, Fred Graham, Dorothy Granger, Ronald Howard, Lon McCallister, and Ian Wolfe.

Production

Development 
Producer Irving Thalberg pushed MGM for five years to make a film of Romeo and Juliet, in spite of studio head Louis B. Mayer's resistance. Mayer believed that the mass audience considered the Bard over their heads, and also he was concerned with the studio's budget constraints during the early years of the Great Depression. It was only when Jack L. Warner announced his intention to film Max Reinhardt's A Midsummer Night's Dream at Warner Bros. that Mayer, not to be outdone, gave Thalberg the go-ahead. The success of a 1934 Broadway revival also encouraged the idea of a film version. It starred Katharine Cornell as Juliet, Basil Rathbone as Romeo, Brian Aherne as Mercutio, and Edith Evans as The Nurse. Rathbone is the only actor from the 1934 revival to appear in the film, albeit in the role of Tybalt rather than Romeo. On the stage Tybalt was played by nineteen year old Orson Welles.

Thalberg's stated intention was "to make the production what Shakespeare would have wanted had he possessed the facilities of cinema." He went to great lengths to establish authenticity and the film's intellectual credentials: researchers were sent to Verona to take photographs for the designers; the paintings of Botticelli, Bellini, Carpaccio, and Gozzoli were studied to provide visual inspiration; and two academic advisers (John Tucker Murray of Harvard and William Strunk Jr. of Cornell) were flown to the set, with instructions to criticise the production freely.

Production 

Thalberg had only one choice for director: George Cukor, who was known as "the women's director". Thalberg's vision was that the performance of Norma Shearer, his wife, would dominate the picture. In addition to such noted Shakespearean actors as Howard and Barrymore, Thalberg cast many screen actors and brought in East Coast drama coaches (such as Frances Robinson Duff who coached Shearer) to teach them. In consequence, actors previously noted for naturalism were found to give more stage-like performances. The shoot extended to six months, and the budget reached $2 million, MGM's most expensive sound film up to that time.

As in most Shakespeare-based screenplays, Cukor and his screenwriter Talbot Jennings cut much of the original play, using around 45% of it. Many of these cuts are common ones in the theatre, such as the second chorus and the comic scene of Peter with the musicians. Others are filmic: designed to replace words with action, or rearranging scenes in order to introduce groups of characters in longer narrative sequences. Jennings retained more of Shakespeare's poetry for the young lovers than any of his big-screen successors. Several scenes are interpolated, including three sequences featuring Friar John in Mantua. In contrast, the role of Friar Laurence (an important character in the play) is much reduced. A number of scenes are expanded as opportunities for visual spectacle, including the opening brawl (set against the backdrop of a religious procession), the wedding and Juliet's funeral. The party scene, choreographed by Agnes de Mille, includes Rosaline (an unseen character in Shakespeare's script) who rebuffs Romeo. The role of Peter is enlarged, and played by Andy Devine as a faint-hearted bully. He speaks lines which Shakespeare gave to other Capulet servants, making him the instigator of the opening brawl. The film includes two songs drawn from other plays by Shakespeare: "Come Away Death" from Twelfth Night and "Honour, Riches, Marriage, Blessing" from The Tempest.

Clusters of images are used to define the central characters: Romeo is first sighted leaning against a ruined building in an arcadian scene, complete with a pipe-playing shepherd and his dog; the livelier Juliet is associated with Capulet's formal garden, with its decorative fish pond.

Premiere
On the night of the Los Angeles premiere of the film at the Carthay Circle Theatre, legendary MGM producer Irving Thalberg, husband of Norma Shearer, died at age 37. The stars in attendance were so grief-stricken that publicist Frank Whitbeck, standing in front of the theater, abandoned his usual policy of interviewing them for a radio broadcast as they entered and simply announced each one as he or she arrived.

Reception
According to MGM records, the film earned $2,075,000 worldwide but because of its high production cost lost $922,000.

Some critics liked the film, but on the whole, neither critics nor the public responded enthusiastically. Graham Greene wrote that he was "less than ever convinced that there is an aesthetic justification for filming Shakespeare at all... the effect of even the best scenes is to distract." "Ornate but not garish, extravagant but in perfect taste, expansive but never overwhelming, the picture reflects great credit upon its producers and upon the screen as a whole", wrote Frank Nugent in a rave review for The New York Times. "It is a dignified, sensitive and entirely admirable Shakespearean—not Hollywoodean—production." Variety called the film a "faithful" adaptation with "very beautiful" costuming, but also found it "not too imaginative" and "a long sit" at over two hours. Film Daily raved that it was a "superb and important achievement" and "one of the most important contributions to the screen since the inception of talking pictures." John Mosher of The New Yorker called it "a very definite achievement" but "somewhat cumbersome", writing "This is a good, sensible presentation of 'Romeo and Juliet,' but it won't be one you'll hark back to when you are discussing the movies as great art, if you do ever discuss them as great art."

Many moviegoers considered the film too "arty", staying away as they had from Warner's A Midsummer Night's Dream a year before and leading Hollywood to abandon the Bard for over a decade. The film nevertheless received four Oscar nominations  and for many years was considered one of the great MGM classics. In his annual Movie and Video Guide, Leonard Maltin gives both this film version and the popular 1968 Franco Zeffirelli version (with Olivia Hussey and Leonard Whiting) an equal rating of three-and-a-half stars.

More recently, scholar Stephen Orgel describes Cukor's film as "largely miscast ... with a preposterously mature pair of lovers in Leslie Howard and Norma Shearer, and an elderly John Barrymore as a stagey Mercutio decades out of date." Barrymore was in his fifties, and played Mercutio as a flirtatious tease. Orgel adds that Tybalt, often portrayed as a hot-headed troublemaker, is played by Basil Rathbone as stuffy and pompous.

Patricia Tatspaugh observes that subsequent film versions made use of "younger, less experienced but more photogenic actors" in the central roles. Cukor, interviewed in 1970, said of this film: "It's one picture that if I had to do over again, I'd know how. I'd get the garlic and the Mediterranean into it."

Awards and honors

In 2002, the American Film Institute nominated this film for AFI's 100 Years...100 Passions.

The film is listed in the book The New York Times' Guide to the Best 1,000 Movies Ever Made (1999 and 2004)).

Legacy 
A colour roll of 16mm Kodachrome filmed by co-star Leslie Howard during the opening exterior sequence with Howard and Reginald Denny in costume as the crew set up is featured in the 2016 documentary Leslie Howard: The Man Who Gave a Damn.

See also
 Romeo and Juliet on screen

References

External links
 
 
 
 
 
 Romeo and Juliet at Virtual History
 George Cukor and cast going over script left to right: Edna Mae Oliver, Cukor, Norma Shearer, Leslie Howard, John Barrymore, Basil Rathbone, Violet Kemble-Cooper, ? unidentified, Henry Kolker

 

1936 films
American black-and-white films
1930s English-language films
Films directed by George Cukor
Metro-Goldwyn-Mayer films
Films based on Romeo and Juliet
Films set in Italy
Films produced by Irving Thalberg
Films scored by Herbert Stothart
American romantic drama films
1936 romantic drama films
1930s American films